The Dorrance State Bank, at 512 Main St. in Dorrance, Kansas, was built in 1905. It was listed on the National Register of Historic Places in 2011.

It is a one-story building built to serve first as the Citizens State Bank.

It is Early Commercial in style.

It served local farmers and merchants in its rural community until it closed in 1933 during the Great Depression.

References

Bank buildings on the National Register of Historic Places in Kansas
National Register of Historic Places in Russell County, Kansas
Early Commercial architecture in the United States
Commercial buildings completed in 1905
1905 establishments in Kansas